Huron Valley Schools is a school district located in Oakland County, Michigan which serves the communities of Commerce Township, Highland Township, Milford, and White Lake. The headquarters are in Highland Township.

The district is made up of fifteen schools, including three high schools, three middle schools, and nine elementary schools.

The Huron Valley School District is known throughout Michigan for several things. It has a track and field team that has been the best in the state two years in a row. The district also has been ranked highly in the state for its academics.  Lakeland High School has been named to Newsweek Magazine's Best High Schools in the United States in both 2009 and 2010. The district's HOT Robotics FIRST team has also been very successful in competition, as well as its high school DECA chapters. Its Future Problem Solving Program is also very successful. In 05–06 season they won 5 out of the 10 state trophies for the divisions they competed in with one team going on to the Internationals in Colorado.  The Kurtz Elementary Destination ImagiNation team has participated in the global competition in Knoxville Tennessee in 2009 and 2010.  It is also known for its International Baccalaureate program through the International Academy West.

Schools

High schools
Milford High School located in Highland Township
Lakeland High School located in White Lake
Harbor High School in Highland; alternative high school

Middle schools
Muir Middle School, in Milford
Oak Valley Middle School, in Commerce Township
White Lake Middle School, in White Lake

Elementary schools
Baker elementary, in Milford (closed)
Brooks Elementary, in White Lake (Closed)
Country Oaks Elementary, in Commerce Township
Heritage Elementary, in Highland
Highland Elementary, in Highland
Johnson Elementary, in Milford
Kurtz Elementary, in Milford
Lakewood Elementary, in White Lake
Oxbow Community School, in White Lake Township
Spring Mills Elementary, in Highland

Other facilities
Apollo Elementary - re-purposed
Baker Elementary - demolished in 2013
Highland Middle School - demolished in 2013
Duck Lake Center, in Highland - serves continuing education as well as Harbor High School

References

External links

 

School districts in Michigan
Education in Oakland County, Michigan